Stankowo  is a village in the administrative district of Gmina Dźwierzuty, within Szczytno County, Warmian-Masurian Voivodeship, in northern Poland.

The village has a population of 130.

References

Stankowo